Dollar General Corp. v. Mississippi Band of Choctaw Indians, 579 U.S. ___ (2016), was a United States Supreme Court case in which the Court was asked to determine if an American Indian tribal court had the jurisdiction to hear a civil case involving a non-Indian who operated a Dollar General store on tribal land under a consensual relationship with the tribe. The Court was equally divided, 4–4, and thereby affirmed the decision of the lower court, in this case the United States Court of Appeals for the Fifth Circuit, that the court had jurisdiction.

Background 

The Mississippi Band of Choctaw Indians, unlike many tribes, does not have a central reservation, but instead consists of eight tribal communities in Mississippi. Those communities are on land held in trust by the U.S. Government for the benefit of the tribe.

Beginning in 2000, Dollar General has had a lease from the tribe to operate a store on tribal land, and obtained a business license from the tribe. In 2003, a 13-year-old tribal member, identified as John Doe in court documents, was working at the store as part of a joint tribal-Dollar General internship program. Doe alleged that the store manager sexually abused him in 2003 causing "severe mental trauma". The tribe took action to legally exclude the manager from tribal lands, but the United States Attorney did not criminally prosecute him.

Tribal and District Courts 

In 2005, Doe sued the store manager and Dollar General in the tribal court. The defendants tried to get the case dismissed, claiming that the tribal court did not have subject matter jurisdiction over non-Indians. The tribal court refused to dismiss the lawsuit, and the  Choctaw Supreme Court affirmed, noting the case of Montana v. United States allowed tribes to exercise civil, as opposed to criminal, jurisdiction over non-Indians on tribal land when the non-Indians had entered into a voluntary relationship with the tribe.

The store manager and Dollar General then sued the Tribe in the United States District Court for the Southern District of Mississippi, seeking to stop the suit in tribal court. The manager was dropped from the case by the district court but Dollar General was held to have been in a consensual relationship and subject to the tribe's jurisdiction.

Court of Appeals 

The defendants then appealed to the Fifth Circuit, which affirmed the decision of the district court. The case was heard by a three-judge panel consisting of Judges Jerry Edwin Smith, Catharina Haynes, and James E. Graves Jr. Judge Graves delivered the opinion of the Court, finding that the facts in the case met the first exception noted in Montana, allowing the tribal court to exercise jurisdiction of Dollar General.

Supreme Court

Arguments 
Dollar General then appealed to the U.S. Supreme Court, asking the court to determine if Indian tribes had the power to hear tort cases against non-Indians who were involved in a consensual relationship with the tribe. They argue that the power that tribes may have once had to adjudicate matters involving non-Indians had been stripped away, and that it would take action by Congress or the unambiguous consent of the non-Indian to confer such jurisdiction. Dollar General urged the Court to make a ruling on civil jurisdiction that was similar to the ruling it made on criminal jurisdiction, in Oliphant v. Suquamish Indian Tribe.

The Choctaw tribe argued that it had inherent tribal sovereignty until Congress expressly removed the tribe's authority. The tribe stated that this issue had been decided by Montana and that the only issue was the consent of Dollar General.

The Solicitor General supported the Choctaw position and urged the Court not to accept the case. He further argued that the decision of the Fifth Circuit was proper.

Opinion 
The per curiam opinion of the Court was announced by Chief Justice John Roberts on June 23, 2016. The text of the opinion stated "The judgment is affirmed by an equally divided Court." The death of Justice Antonin Scalia in February had left the Court with eight members, and cases which are equally divided result in the lower case ruling standing, but without precedent being established. It is as if the Court had never heard the case.

Footnotes

References

External links
 

Mississippi Band of Choctaw Indians
United States Native American case law
United States Supreme Court cases
United States Supreme Court cases of the Roberts Court
2016 in United States case law
Dollar General